Tephronota is a genus of picture-winged flies in the family Ulidiidae.

Species
 Tephronota canadensis
 Tephronota humilis

References

Ulidiidae